Fritz Pellkofer (3 August 1902 – 23 January 1943) was a German cross-country skier. He competed in the men's 50 kilometre event at the 1928 Winter Olympics. He was declared missing in action during World War II.

References

External links
 

1902 births
1943 deaths
German male cross-country skiers
Olympic cross-country skiers of Germany
Cross-country skiers at the 1928 Winter Olympics
People from Miesbach (district)
Sportspeople from Upper Bavaria
German military personnel killed in World War II
Missing in action of World War II
20th-century German people